Chang Yu-fa (born 1 February 1935) is a Chinese historian from Taiwan.

He was born in Shandong on 1 February 1935, and moved to Taiwan in 1949. Chang earned a bachelor's degree from National Taiwan University, and two master's degrees, one in history from Columbia University, and the other in journalism from National Chengchi University. He served as director of Academia Sinica's  from 1985 to 1991, and was elected as academician of Academia Sinica in 1992. After leaving the directorship, Chang remained at the Institute of Modern History as an adjunct research fellow.

Selected publications

References

1935 births
Living people
Members of Academia Sinica
National Chengchi University alumni
Columbia Graduate School of Arts and Sciences alumni
National Taiwan University alumni
Historians of China
Historians from Shandong
Writers from Zaozhuang
Taiwanese people from Shandong
20th-century Taiwanese historians
Taiwanese male writers
21st-century Taiwanese historians
20th-century Chinese historians
21st-century Chinese historians